DuFay A. Fuller (February 21, 1852 – March 3, 1924) was an American businessman and politician.

Fuller was born in Boone County, Illinois. He went to the public schools. Fuller was involved in the life insurance business. He lived in Belvidere, Illinois with his wife and family. Fuller served on the school board and was a Republican. He served in the Illinois House of Representatives from 1897 to 1901 and in the Illinois Senate from 1901 to 1905. He also served as an Illinois state parole officer. Fuller died from a heart attack at his home in Belvidee, Illinois. His brother was Charles Eugene Fuller who also served in the Illinois General Assembly.

Notes

External links

1852 births
1924 deaths
People from Belvidere, Illinois
Businesspeople from Illinois
School board members in Illinois
Republican Party members of the Illinois House of Representatives
Republican Party Illinois state senators